Láadan (/ˈlɑ˦ɑˈdɑn/) is a gynocentric constructed language created by Suzette Haden Elgin in 1982 to test the Sapir–Whorf hypothesis, specifically to determine if development of a language aimed at expressing the views of women would shape a culture; a subsidiary hypothesis was that Western natural languages may be better suited for expressing the views of men than women. The language was included in her science fiction Native Tongue series. Láadan contains a number of words that are used to make unambiguous statements that include how one feels about what one is saying. According to Elgin, this is designed to counter male-centered language's limitations on women, who are forced to respond "I know I said that, but I meant this".

Phonology

Tones 
Láadan is a tonal language. It utilises two distinct tones:
 ló, a short, high tone, represented by a single marked vowel
The word "Láadan" has three syllables: "lá-" with the short vowel /a/ plus high tone; "-a" with the short vowel /a/ and no tone; and "-dan".

Láadan doesn't allow any double [i.e. long] phonemes. Whenever two identical short vowels would occur side by side in a single morpheme, one of them has to be marked for high tone. When adding an affix would result in two identical vowels side by side, an epenthetic /h/ is inserted to prevent the forbidden sequence. The language will allow either "máa" or "maá," but not "maa". These combinations can be described as:
 loó, a long, low-rising tone, represented by a double vowel, the second of which is marked
 lóo, a long, high-falling tone, represented by a double vowel, the first of which is marked
(Some people analyze these tone sequences as tonemic as well, for a total of four tones.)

Elgin preferred an analysis of the language as having no long vowels and a single tone, the high tone (distinguished from "neutral, baseline pitch"), but she acknowledged that linguists using other formalisms would be justified in saying that there are two tones, high and low (or unmarked or mid).

Vowels 
Láadan has five vowels:
 a, an open back unrounded vowel (as English calm),
 e, an open-mid front unrounded vowel (as English bell),
 i, a near-close near-front unrounded vowel (as English bit),
 o, a close-mid back rounded vowel (as English home),
 u, a close back rounded vowel (as English boon).

Consonants 

Láadan lacks the consonants . However, it uses b, d, sh, m, n, l, r, w, y, h with the same phonetic value as English. In addition to these, three digraphs require further explanation:
 th, a voiceless dental fricative (always as in English think, never as then),
 zh, a voiced postalveolar fricative (as English pleasure),
 lh, a voiceless alveolar lateral fricative (as Welsh llan).

Grammar 

Most Láadan sentences contain three particles:

 The speech-act particlethis occurs at the beginning of the sentence and marks it as either a statement (bíi), a question (báa), et cetera; in connected speech or writing, this particle is often omitted. They are:
 Bíi  Indicates a declarative sentence (usually optional)
 Báa  Indicates a question
 Bó  Indicates a command; very rare, except to small children
 Bóo  Indicates a request; this is the usual imperative/"command" form
 Bé  Indicates a promise
 Bée  Indicates a warning
 The grammatical tense particlethis occurs second in the sentence and marks it as either present tense (ril), past tense (eril), future tense (aril) or hypothetical (wil); without the tense particle, the sentence is assumed to have the same tense as the previous sentence.
 The evidence particlethis occurs at the end of statements and indicates the trustworthiness of the statement. They are:
 wa  Known to speaker because perceived by speaker, externally or internally
 wi  Known to speaker because self-evident
 we  Perceived by speaker in a dream
 wáa  Assumed true by speaker because speaker trusts source
 waá  Assumed false by speaker because speaker distrusts source; if evil intent by the source is also assumed, the form is "waálh"
 wo  Imagined or invented by speaker, hypothetical
 wóo  Used to indicate that the speaker states a total lack of knowledge as to the validity of the matter

Láadan is a verb–subject–object (VSO) language. Verbs and adjectives are interchangeable. There are no articles, and the object is marked by the -th or -eth suffix. The plural number is shown only by the me- prefix to the verb. The particle ra following a verb makes it negative. Separate clauses are joined by the particle hé.

OBJ:object
REQ:request
ST

Morphology 
Láadan has an agglutinative morphology, and uses a number of affixes to indicate various feelings and moods that many natural languages can only indicate by tone of voice, body language or circumlocution.

The speech-act particle, at the beginning of a sentence, can also carry several suffixes, which expand on the overall state of the sentence. For example, bíi begins a statement, but bíide begins a statement that is part of a narrative; bóoth begins a request made in pain; báada begins a question that is meant in jest.

Pronouns 
Pronouns in Láadan are built up from a number of constituent parts. The consonant l marks the first person, n the second person and b the third person. Usually, these are followed by the vowel e. However, the vowel a is used to designate someone who is loved (lhe- is prefixed to describe someone who is despised). The suffix -zh is used to mark a plural pronoun for numbers up to four, and -n for numbers beyond that. Therefore,  means "we, several beloved", and  means "they, many despised".

See also 
Language and gender
Muted group theory

References

Further reading 
Elgin, Suzette Haden, & Diane Martin. A First Dictionary and Grammar of Láadan. Madison: Society for the Furtherance and Study of Fantasy and Science Fiction, 1988.
Jones, Mari C. and Ishtla Singh, Exploring Language Change: Routledge, 2005; pp. 169–182.

External links 

 
 Elgin's Láadan introduction
 Lesson One of Láadan Made Easier
 A Láadan Sampler
 Elgin’s critique of others’ analysis of Láadan:
 Myths About Láadan
 Just One More Láadan Myth
 Láadan lessons (moderately paced lessons in Láadan by A.M.J. "Amberwind" Barnhart; archived from prior URL)
 Some Láadan (PDF) (The text says that "wo-" is a plural marker. This is an error; the plural marker is "me-", while "wo-" is a relativizer.)
 Láadan Working Group
 How to count in Láadan
 : a critical video review of the basics of Láadan as an artlang
 Essays and guides about Láadan, a group blog

Agglutinative languages
Engineered languages
Feminist science fiction
Fictional languages
Constructed languages introduced in the 1980s
1982 introductions
Gender in language
Tonal languages